Copperbelt North is an electoral district which returns a member (known as an MLA) to the Legislative Assembly of Yukon in Canada. The riding was created in 2009 following the amalgamation of part of the district of Whitehorse West and the former district of Copperbelt. It includes much of the Whitehorse subdivision of Copper Ridge, as well as the Lobird mobile home park.

Members of the Legislative Assembly

Election results

2021 general election

2016 general election

|-

| Liberal
| Ted Adel
| align="right"| 566
| align="right"| 45.1%
| align="right"| +10.8%

| NDP
| André Bourcier
| align="right"| 161
| align="right"| 12.8%
| align="right"| -0.6%

|-
! align=left colspan=3|Total
! align=right| 1256
! align=right| 100.0%
! align=right| –
|}

2011 general election

|-

|-

| Liberal
| Arthur Mitchell
| align="right"| 407
| align="right"| 37.4%
| align="right"| –
|-

| NDP
| Skeeter Miller-Wright
| align="right"| 159
| align="right"| 14.6%
| align="right"| –
|-
! align=left colspan=3|Total
! align=right| 1088
! align=right| 100.0%
! align=right| –
|}

References

Yukon territorial electoral districts
Politics of Whitehorse
2009 establishments in Yukon